Mount Bennett is a prominent mountain (3,090 m) about 3 nautical miles (6 km) east of Mount Boyd, surmounting the west part of Anderson Heights, Queen Maud Mountains. Discovered by the United States Antarctic Service (USAS) (1939–41), and surveyed by the U.S. Ross Ice Shelf Traverse Party (1957–58) led by A.P. Crary. Named by Crary for Hugh Bennett, seismologist with the party.

Mountains of the Ross Dependency
Dufek Coast